Grand Superior terroir in the village of Noszvaj which is located in the Eger wine region, in Central Europe, Hungary. The Eger region has a cooler climate, which is similar to Burgundy or to the Northern Rhône wine regions. The continental climate and diverse soils make it capable of producing both red and white varietals.

The terroir 
The terroir consist of gently sloping forest soils interspersed with volcanic rocks. This site produces well balanced and well-rounded wines.

The Nagyfai terroir is almost exclusively in the possession of Kovács Nimród Winery (KNW). KNW has 12 hectares (30 acres) in Nagyfai.

Varietals of the terroir include: Pinot Gris, Chardonnay, Pinot Noir, Syrah, Kékfrankos, Merlot and Cabernet Franc.

References 

Wine regions of Hungary